is a town located in Kamikawa Subprefecture, Hokkaido, Japan.

As of September 2016, the town has an estimated population of 8,092, and a density of 33 persons per km2. The total area is 247.06 km2.

Climate

References

External links

Official Website 
Tourism Info 

Towns in Hokkaido